Nichols is a village in Outagamie County, Wisconsin, United States. The population was 273 at the 2010 census.

History
The village was named after Arthur L. Nichols, who established the town.

Geography
Nichols is located at  (44.564581, -88.464646).

Demographics

As of 2000 the median income for a household in the village was $36,042, and the median income for a family was $45,000. Males had a median income of $29,583 versus $25,893 for females. The per capita income for the village was $15,898. About 3.9% of families and 3.6% of the population were below the poverty line, including 3.2% of those under the age of eighteen and 11.1% of those 65 or over.

2010 census
As of the census of 2010, there were 273 people, 112 households, and 69 families residing in the village. The racial makeup of the village was 95.2% White, 2.9% Native American, and 1.8% from other races. Hispanic or Latino of any race were 1.8% of the population.

There were 112 households, of which 33.9% had children under the age of 18 living with them, 48.2% were married couples living together, 9.8% had a female householder with no husband present, 3.6% had a male householder with no wife present, and 38.4% were non-families. 34.8% of all households were made up of individuals, and 8.1% had someone living alone who was 65 years of age or older. The average household size was 2.44 and the average family size was 3.13.

The median age in the village was 33.5 years. 26.7% of residents were under the age of 18; 9.1% were between the ages of 18 and 24; 28.3% were from 25 to 44; 26.8% were from 45 to 64; and 9.2% were 65 years of age or older. The gender makeup of the village was 54.9% male and 45.1% female.

Images

References

External links
 Village of Nichols, Wisconsin - Official Website

Villages in Outagamie County, Wisconsin
Villages in Wisconsin